Brookfield station is a former Canadian National Railway station in Brookfield, Colchester County, Nova Scotia, built in 1938 or 1933.

In 1998, the building was moved from its former location adjacent to the railway line to another location in Brookfield, Ed Creelman Memorial Park.
The station building and the park in which it is located are now operated by a community group, Brookfield Railway Station and Heritage Society. The station building houses historical artifacts and the grounds are used for community events.

References

Buildings and structures in Colchester County
Railway stations in Nova Scotia
Canadian National Railway stations